The 1979 North American Soccer League season was the 67th season of FIFA-sanctioned soccer and the 12th with a national first-division league in the United States and Canada.

Changes from the previous season

Rules changes
A rule modification required that each squad play two U.S. or Canadian players and that each 17-man roster carry six such players.

New teams
None

Teams folding
None

Teams moving
Colorado Caribous to Atlanta Chiefs
Oakland Stompers to Edmonton Drillers

Name changes
Cosmos to New York Cosmos
Toronto Metros-Croatia to Toronto Blizzard

Season recap
Compared to the previous season's upheaval, 1979 was a relatively tranquil year. The league format remained unchanged with 24 teams divided into six divisions within two conferences, and a 16-team playoff. A slight modification to the first round of the playoffs, from a single game to the two-game format used in later rounds, was made. Also the minigame, used to decide tied playoff series, no longer ended on a golden goal (sudden death). Instead, the entire 30 minutes was played.

Still, there were issues to be sorted out. There was a brief players' strike on April 14, as the league refused to recognize the newly formed Players Association. However, since the majority of NASL players were foreign and unsure of American and Canadian labor laws, support was minimal. An estimated three quarters of NASL players crossed the picket line once the Justice Department implied that foreign players would be subject to deportation.

The Cosmos decided to put "New York" back into their name after a two-year absence. With a change in ownership, the Toronto franchise was now called the Toronto Blizzard, while Toronto Croatia (who had merged with the Metros back in 1975) returned to their old league, the National Soccer League. The Colorado Caribous moved to Atlanta to become the reborn Atlanta Chiefs in October 1978, while the Oakland Stompers would move to Edmonton just a month before the start of the season. Both teams struggled, finishing last in their respective divisions. The new Edmonton Drillers were particularly bad, setting a record for most consecutive losses in league history with 14.

At the other end of the table, the Houston Hurricane went from worst to first in the American Conference, going undefeated in their 15 home matches at the Astrodome and earning Timo Liekoski Coach of the Year honors. However, the Hurricane were upset in the first round of the ASC playoffs, as the Philadelphia Fury, who were winless on the road during the regular season, won the deciding game in Houston.

That meant the door was opened for the Tampa Bay Rowdies to win their second straight ASC title, sweeping the Fury and outlasting the San Diego Sockers in a minigame at Tampa Stadium. The Rowdies were led by Oscar Fabbiani's 25 goals and a defense that gave up 46 goals, the second-fewest in the league.

The two-time defending champion Cosmos kept rolling, posting another 24–6 record and surpassing their league record for points with 216. Johan Cruyff joined the team in the fall of 1978 for a few exhibitions, but the Los Angeles Aztecs bought out his NASL option for $600,000 to take him to the West Coast. Cruyff scored two goals against the Rochester Lancers on his debut, while leading the Aztecs to a nine-win turnaround. Despite their second-round playoff loss to the Vancouver Whitecaps, he earned league MVP honors for his efforts.

New York proved that they did not need him to score goals, as Giorgio Chinaglia led the league for the third straight year. However, he lost out on the scoring title by a point to Fabbiani. As befitting their status within the league, the Cosmos had the honor of playing in the first game of ABC Sports' three-year TV contract with the league in May; a Soccer Bowl '78 rematch in which they lost 3–2 at Tampa Bay. The network would cover nine regular-season and playoff games per year. This included coverage of the next three Soccer Bowls.

However, the league's dream of the Cosmos hosting another Soccer Bowl in front of a national TV audience went up in smoke when New York lost to Vancouver in a memorable playoff matchup. After the Whitecaps won the first game of the National Conference final in Vancouver, the teams played for three and a half hours at Giants Stadium three days later on ABC. The Cosmos won the regular game in a shootout, tying the series at one. The deciding minigame would also go to a shootout, where Derek Possee gave Vancouver the lead. After the Cosmos' Ricky Davis and the Whitecaps' Alan Ball missed on their chances, New York's Nelsi Morais was unable to beat the five-second clock and his goal was waved off, giving Vancouver the win.

Vancouver went on to beat the Rowdies a week later in the Soccer Bowl. Trevor Whymark scored both Vancouver goals and earned game MVP honors, while Tampa Bay suffered their second straight loss in the championship game. Attendance at Giants Stadium was well below projections, as 50,699 showed up despite 66,843 tickets having been sold. The Whitecaps' Alan Ball was named playoff MVP for his seven-assist effort in Vancouver's championship run. Attendance estimates vary (they range from 60,000 to 150,000 people), but the resulting championship parade is still considered the largest public demonstration in Vancouver civic history.

Another positive sign for the league was that this would be the first offseason in NASL history where no franchises folded or moved.

Regular season
W = Wins, L = Losses, GF = Goals For, GA = Goals Against, BP = Bonus Points, Pts = Point System

6 points for a win, 0 points for a loss, 1 point for each regulation goal scored up to three per game.
-Playoffs via division standings. -Playoffs via wildcard.

American Conference

*San Diego and California finished the season with identical records and point totals. San Diego was awarded the division title due to a better goal differential.

National Conference

Overall

NASL League Leaders

Scoring
GP = Games Played, G = Goals (worth 2 points), A = Assists (worth 1 point), Pts = Points

Goalkeeping
Note: GP = Games played; Min - Minutes played; GA = Goals against; GAA = Goals against average; W = Wins; L = Losses; SO = Shutouts

NASL All-Stars

Playoffs

The top two teams from each division qualified for the playoffs automatically. The two teams with the highest point totals remaining in each conference filled out the field as wild cards and were given the lowest first round seeds. Playoff match-ups and home/away status were reset after each round, based on regular season point totals.

In 1979 and 1980, if a playoff series was tied at one victory each, a full 30 minute mini-game was played. If neither team held an advantage after the 30 minutes, the teams would then move on to an NASL shoot-out to determine a series winner.

Bracket

First round

Conference semifinals

Conference Championships

Soccer Bowl '79

1979 NASL Champions: Vancouver Whitecaps

Post season awards
Most Valuable Player: Johan Cruyff, Los Angeles 
Coach of the year: Timo Liekoski, Houston 
Rookie of the year: Larry Hulcer, Los Angeles
 North American Player of the Year:  Rick Davis, New York
Playoff MVP: Alan Ball, Vancouver ''

Average home attendance

References

External links
 The Year in American Soccer – 1979
 Chris Page's NASL Archive
 Complete NASL Results and Standings

 
North American Soccer League (1968–1984) seasons
1979 in American soccer
1979 in Canadian soccer